Christina Sverresdatter (Norwegian: Kristin Sverresdatter; died 1213) was a medieval Norwegian princess and titular queen consort, spouse of co-regent Philip Simonsson, the Bagler party pretender to the throne of Norway.

Biography

Christina was the daughter of King Sverre Sigurdsson of Norway and his Swedish queen consort, Margaret. Her father died in 1202 and her mother returned to Sweden, forced to leave Christina behind. In 1209, she married Norwegian aristocrat Philip Simonsson. She died in labour giving birth to their first child, a son, who also died soon after.

Her marriage was arranged as a part of reconciliation between the Bagler and Birkebeiner factions during the period of the Civil war era in Norway. In 1208, with no side looking able to achieve victory, Bishop Nikolas Arnesson together with other bishops of the Church,  brokered a peace deal between the Baglers and the Birkebeiners. At the settlement of Kvitsøy, the Birkebeiner candidate for king, Inge II of Norway, recognized Philip's rule over the eastern third of the country in return for Philip giving up any claim to the title of king and recognizing King Inge as his overlord. To seal the agreement, Philip was to marry King Sverre's daughter, Christina.

Thea Sofie Loch Naes portrayed a heavily fictionalized Christina (named Kristin) in the 2016 film The Last King.

Historic context
In Norwegian civil war era it was usual that several royal sons fought against each other over power in Norway. The civil war period of Norwegian history lasted from 1130 to 1240. During this period there were several interlocked conflicts of varying scale and intensity. The background for these conflicts were the unclear Norwegian succession laws, social conditions and the struggle between Church and King. There were then two main parties, firstly known by varying names or no names at all, but finally condensed into parties of Bagler and Birkebeiner. The rallying point regularly was a royal son, who was set up as the head figure of the party in question, to oppose the rule of king from the contesting party.

Olympic Mascot
Håkon and Kristin are the mascots of the 1994 Winter Olympics. Håkon is named after Haakon IV of Norway and Kristin after Christina of Norway.

References

1190s births
1213 deaths
Deaths in childbirth
Norwegian princesses
Year of birth unknown
House of Sverre
Fairhair dynasty
Norwegian royal consorts
12th-century Norwegian women
13th-century Norwegian women
12th-century Norwegian people
13th-century Norwegian people
Daughters of kings